Bibra a small river in southern Thuringia, Germany. It is a tributary of the Jüchse which is in turn a tributary of the Werra. It flows through the village Bibra.

See also
List of rivers of Thuringia

Rivers of Thuringia
Rivers of Germany